The Almoravid is the debut album led by drummer Joe Chambers recorded in 1971 and 1973 and released on the Muse label.

Reception

In his review for AllMusic, Scott Yanow stated "In most cases, the leader's drums and the percussionists are in the forefront, the individual selections have weak themes and, although the complex rhythms are intriguing, the music is not all that memorable. Perhaps if the selections had been programmed as a suite or if there was some logical development from tune to tune, then this well-intentioned effort would have been more successful."

Track listing
All compositions by Joe Chambers except as indicated
 "The Almoravid" - 7:53 		
 "Early Minor" (Joe Zawinul) - 6:50 		
 "Gazelle Suite" - 3:37
 "Catta" (Andrew Hill) - 4:51 		
 "Medina" - 8:24
 "Jihad" - 6:17
Recorded February 10, 1971 (#2, 5); October 8, 1973 (#1, 4); November 1, 1973 (#3, 6).

Personnel
Joe Chambers - drums
Woody Shaw - trumpet (tracks 2 & 5)
Garnett Brown - trombone (tracks 2 & 5)
Harold Vick - tenor saxophone, flute (tracks 2 & 5)
Cedar Walton - piano, electric piano (tracks 1 & 4)
George Cables - electric piano (tracks 2 & 5)
Cecil McBee - bass (tracks 2 & 5)
Walter Booker (tracks 3 & 6), Richard Davis (tracks 1 & 4), - electric bass 
Omar Clay (tracks 1, 3, 4 & 6), David Friedman (tracks 1 & 4), Doug Hawthorne (tracks 3 & 6) - marimba, percussion
Ray Mantilla - congas, percussion (tracks 1, 3, 4 & 6)

References

1974 albums
Joe Chambers albums
Muse Records albums
Albums produced by Don Schlitten